Goderich may refer to:

Places
 Goderich, Ontario, in Canada
 Goderich, Sierra Leone
 Goderich County, Western Australia

Other
 Goderich Airport
 Goderich Celtic Roots Festival
 Goderich District Collegiate Institute
 Goderich Ministry
 Goderich Pirates
 Goderich Sailors
 Goderich United
 Goderich–Exeter Railway
 Viscount Goderich